Ghatu, Ghetu Gaan, or Ghetu Song is a type traditional cultural song of the Eastern Part of the Bangladesh. The songs were traditionally sung during the monsoon season, though the tradition is on the decline. The festival was mainly held in north-eastern side of Mymensingh and lower part of Sylhet in Bangladesh.

History
The first day of Bhadro (5th month of Bengali calendar) started on the eve of Bisharjan of Manasha (Bengali: মনসার ভাসান) and later celebrated on the day of Vijaya Dashami during the monsoon season.

The festival revolves around a teenage boy. The boy dresses in shari and grows out his hair, with the intent of resembling a girl. The very young boys were sexually abused and that contributed to the decline of this form of music. During the festival he plays the role of pantomime by dancing or otherwise representing the Ghatu song. The Ghatu songs are mainly oriented around Radha Krishna.

In popular culture 
 The film Ghetuputra Komola by Humayun Ahmed was based on the life of a young Ghatu Singer.

References

Bengali folk songs
Bangladeshi culture
Arts in Bangladesh
Culture in Sylhet